Zabór  (1936-45: Fürsteneich) is a village in Zielona Góra County, Lubusz Voivodeship, in western Poland. It is the seat of the gmina (administrative district) called Gmina Zabór.

The Lower Silesian village of Saborin was first mentioned in the early 14th century. It is known for the Baroque Zabór Castle built in 1677, formerly held by the noble house of Schoenaich-Carolath. Princess Hermine Reuss of Greiz (1887–1947), widow of German Emperor Wilhelm II (1859–1941), lived here from her husband's death until her flight in 1945.

Napoleon Oak grew near Zabór, tree collapsed due to an arson on May, 2010. It was one of the largest oaks in Europe.

The village currently has a population of about 950.

References

Villages in Zielona Góra County